Gustavo Andrés Oberman (born 25 March 1985 in Quilmes, Buenos Aires) is an Argentine football player.

Career 
Nicknamed Cachete, Oberman began his career at Argentinos Juniors in 2003, after the 2005 Clausura tournament he was transferred to River Plate, but he only spent one season there before returning to Argentinos Juniors in summer 2006. In June 2008 he was transferred from CD Castellón to the CFR Cluj of Romania for 500.000 $.

Since joining CFR Cluj Oberman has been loaned out to Córdoba CF of Spain in 2009 and then back to his first club Argentinos Juniors between 2009 and 2010 where he was an important member of the team that won the Clausura 2010 championship. He played in 16 of the club's 19 games during the championship winning campaign.

International 
He has also played with the Argentina Under-20 team, winning the 2005 FIFA World Youth Championship.

Family 
His father is Enrique Pablo Oberman, a retired football player.

Titles
Argentina U-20
FIFA U-20 World Cup (1): 2005

Argentinos Juniors
Argentine Primera División (1): Clausura 2010

External links
 Argentine Primera statistics at Fútbol XXI  
 Guardian statistics
 

1985 births
Living people
Argentine footballers
Argentine expatriate footballers
Argentina under-20 international footballers
Association football midfielders
Sportspeople from Buenos Aires Province
People from Quilmes
Argentine people of German descent
Argentinos Juniors footballers
Club Atlético River Plate footballers
Quilmes Atlético Club footballers
Olimpo footballers
CD Castellón footballers
CFR Cluj players
Argentino de Quilmes players
San Marcos de Arica footballers
Sportivo Dock Sud players
Argentine Primera División players
Liga I players
Argentine expatriate sportspeople in Romania
Argentine expatriate sportspeople in Spain
Argentine expatriate sportspeople in Chile
Argentine expatriate sportspeople in India
Expatriate footballers in Romania
Expatriate footballers in Spain
Expatriate footballers in Chile
Expatriate footballers in India